Takase may refer to:

Takase (surname)
Takase, Kagawa, a Japanese town
Takase River, a canal in Kyoto, Japan
Takase Station (Kagawa), a railway station
Takase Station (Yamagata), a railway station
2838 Takase, an asteroid
Takase shell from a type of large conch shells, see Nacre